São Domingos (also: Várzea da Igreja) is a city in the central part of the island of Santiago, Cape Verde. In 2010 its population was 2,818. 
It is the seat of the São Domingos Municipality. It is situated 13 km southeast of Assomada and 13 km northwest of the capital Praia, along the national road from Praia to Assomada (EN1-ST01). The settlement appeared in the 1747 map by Jacques-Nicolas Bellin as St. Domingo.

References

Cities in Cape Verde
São Domingos Municipality, Cape Verde
Geography of Santiago, Cape Verde
Municipal seats in Cape Verde